Sigel is a town in Chippewa County in the U.S. state of Wisconsin. The population was 1,044 at the 2010 census, up from 825 at the 2000 census.

History
The area that became Sigel was first surveyed in the fall of 1848 by crews working for the U.S. government. In September 1849 another crew marked all the section corners of the eastern half of Sigel, walking the woods and swamps on foot, measuring with chain and compass. When done, the deputy surveyor filed this general description:
The Surface in this Township is generally level and a fair proportion good fertile soil. It is well watered by numerous small Streams, none of which, however, afford any water power. A large part of the township is well timbered with Birch, Ash, Elm, Lind, Sugar, Oak, Ironwood and Some Pine.
For a surveyor's description of the six mile square that includes the west half of Sigel, see Lafayette.

The town was founded on January 3, 1863, presumably named after Franz Sigel, a colonel in the Union Army during the American Civil War.

Geography
The town of Sigel is located in southern Chippewa County, bordered to the south by Eau Claire County. It is bordered to the north by the Yellow River and the village of Cadott. The Yellow River is a west-flowing tributary of the Chippewa River.

Demographics

As of the census of 2000, there were 825 people, 294 households, and 239 families residing in the town.  The population density was 23.1 people per square mile (8.9/km2).  There were 307 housing units at an average density of 8.6 per square mile (3.3/km2).  The racial makeup of the town was 98.18% White, 0.12% African American, 0.48% Native American, 0.24% Asian, 0.24% from other races, and 0.73% from two or more races. Hispanic or Latino of any race were 0.24% of the population.

There were 294 households, out of which 40.1% had children under the age of 18 living with them, 68.0% were married couples living together, 6.8% had a female householder with no husband present, and 18.4% were non-families. 14.6% of all households were made up of individuals, and 4.1% had someone living alone who was 65 years of age or older.  The average household size was 2.81 and the average family size was 3.07.

In the town, the population was spread out, with 28.4% under the age of 18, 7.2% from 18 to 24, 26.7% from 25 to 44, 27.6% from 45 to 64, and 10.2% who were 65 years of age or older.  The median age was 37 years. For every 100 females, there were 115.4 males.  For every 100 females age 18 and over, there were 114.1 males.

The median income for a household in the town was $37,639, and the median income for a family was $40,833. Males had a median income of $28,750 versus $21,071 for females. The per capita income for the town was $15,635.  About 5.0% of families and 7.1% of the population were below the poverty line, including 8.3% of those under age 18 and 10.6% of those age 65 or over.

Education
Sigel is served by the School District of Cadott Community.

References

Towns in Chippewa County, Wisconsin
Eau Claire–Chippewa Falls metropolitan area
Towns in Wisconsin